The Rebel (US title: Call Me Genius) is a 1961 British satirical comedy film about the clash between bourgeois and bohemian cultures. Starring Tony Hancock, it was written by Ray Galton and Alan Simpson. The film was made by Associated British Picture Corporation and distributed by Warner-Pathé (ABPC's distribution arm).

Plot
Tony, a disaffected London office clerk (Hancock) catches the train to Waterloo Station each morning as he has done for 14 years. In the city he sits as one of many identical clerks in a dull office. Each worker wears a bowler hat and carries an umbrella. One day his boss (John Le Mesurier) catches him drawing faces instead of working, and he is asked to step into his office. His ledgers are full of poor quality caricatures of fellow workers. He is told to take the afternoon off but does not. He leaves at exactly 5.30pm as does everyone else.

Back at his lodgings, in a mid-terraced brick Victorian house, somewhere in outer London, Tony dons his artist's smock, and resumes work on his masterpiece, "Aphrodite at the Waterhole"... a truly horrendous but huge sculpture. His landlady Mrs Cravat (Irene Handl) complains about the hammering noise. He explains he cannot afford a model and it represents "women as he sees them". She threatens to evict him if he does not remove the statue. As he remonstrates with his copy of Van Gogh's self-portrait on his wall, the floor creaks and the statue falls through, luckily missing his landlady below.

In his office attire he goes to a local cafe seeking a coffee "with no froth". This annoys the owner, who tells Tony he has just bought an expensive froth-making machine. Inspired by a poster on the wall Tony decides to go to Paris. He takes a train to Dover with his Aphrodite on a flat-bed wagon to the rear. She loses her head as the train goes through a tunnel. When, on arrival at the port, Tony sees the headless statue he is furious, but worse is to follow. While being loaded onto a ship it proves too heavy for its net, bursts through the bottom and is lost in the sea. Forced to accept the inevitable, he resolves to start again in Paris. On the ferry he throws his bowler hat and umbrella into the sea. Unfortunately it is raining heavily when he arrives in France.

Arriving in Paris, Tony walks along the River Seine and looks at the artists. In the evening he goes to a cafe in Montmartre and meets a group of English-speaking artists. Here he meets Paul, who speaks passionately about art. He orders a half litre of vin ordinaire and they drink together. Paul invites Tony to share his studio and flat, just up the road. The landlady Madame Laurent hears them enter and demands the rent. Tony loves the atmosphere in the studio. Tony is asked to critique Paul's paintings ... "Your colours are the wrong shape" he says.

Paul admires the childlike style of Tony's work: "infantile art". Josey, a red-haired, blue-lipped beatnik visits and invites Tony and Paul to a very large mansion, filled with artwork. Here the Dalí-esque owner, Jim Smith, is sleeping on the bookcase (because he is writing a book). At a party a group of young people all dressed alike hang on Tony's every word. They all think he is fantastic.

Inspired by Jim Smith, Tony starts sleeping on top of the wardrobe and brings a cow to live in the flat. He then tries his first Action painting. Paul decides to leave, and gifts Tony his art.

As his reputation spreads he is visited by Sir Charles Broward, an art collector and buyer who is attracted to Paul's work. Sir Charles asks Tony if Paul's works are his and Tony says they were "a gift". This is misinterpreted. Tony's own work is labelled awful. After the first exhibition he goes to a posh restaurant with Sir Charles. He orders egg and chips... when pushed to choose something more he orders snails, egg and chips and a cup of tea. Sir Charles takes Tony to Monte Carlo, where he goes to dinner with a number of rich guests. One wife, Mrs Carreras, wishes to be painted by Tony. Her husband, after some debate, commissions a sculpture.

Tony injures his fingers while hammering and later at dinner the wife hand feeds him, much to the embarrassment of all. Carreras offers to buy Tony's entire art collection for £50,000.

On the Carreras yacht, Tony dresses as a bird for the fancy dress party. Mrs Carreras dresses as a cat. She tells him she loves him. He rejects her and she threatens to shoot him. On deck, he unveils the statue to the horror of all - it turns out to be a copy of his Aphrodite - and Mrs Carreras accuses him of assaulting her. The statue drops through the ship and Tony escapes on the yacht's launch.

Still dressed as a bird, Tony goes to the airport and says he wants to fly to Britain. "Wouldn't you rather take a plane?" the attendant quips.

He returns to Mrs Cravat's, now finding Paul living with her and working in an office, though still painting as a hobby. Tony persuades Paul to lend him some new paintings, promising to explain later. Showing these paintings at the London exhibition, Tony reveals that Paul is the true artist and "the rubbish" is Tony's work. Leaving Paul to enjoy his newfound fame and fortune Tony returns to Mrs Cravat's and resumes work on his Aphrodite - with Mrs Cravat as the model.

Cast
 Tony Hancock...Anthony Hancock
 George Sanders...Sir Charles Broward
 Paul Massie...Paul
 Margit Saad...Margot
 Grégoire Aslan...Carreras
 Dennis Price...Jim Smith
 Irene Handl...Mrs. Crevatte
 John Le Mesurier...Office manager
 Liz Fraser...Waitress
 Mervyn Johns...Manager of Art Gallery
 Peter Bull...Manager of Art Gallery
 Nanette Newman...Josey
 Marie Burke...Madame Laurent
 Oliver Reed...Artist in Cafe
 Mario Fabrizi...Coffee Bar attendant
 Bernard Rebel...Art dealer
 John Wood...Poet
 Victor Platt...Dockside Official

Production and themes
The Rebel attempts to transfer Hancock's radio and television comedy persona to the big screen, and several regular supporting cast members of Hancock's Half Hour also appeared, including John Le Mesurier, Liz Fraser and Mario Fabrizi. The since-demolished railway station used at the beginning of the film, was Bingham Road in the Croydon suburb of Addiscombe, named Fortune Green South in the film.
The dress-code and regimentation at the railway station had been depicted earlier in 1952's Something Money Can't Buy, during Anthony Steel's daydreaming reverie sequence, working at the local government office.

In The Rebel, existentialist themes are explored by mocking Parisian intellectual life and portraying the pretensions of the English middle class. Galton and Simpson had previously satirised pseudo-intellectuals in the Hancock's Half Hour radio episode "The Poetry Society" (1959), in which Hancock attempts to imitate the style of the pretentious poets and fails, and is infuriated when his idiot friend Bill does the same and wins their enthusiastic approval.

The film also includes scenes parodying modern art. The scene showing Hancock splashing paint onto a canvas and riding a bike over it is a lampoon of the work of Action Painter William Green, while the childlike paintings of Hancock, referred to as the 'infantile school' or the 'shapeist school', parody the naive style.

In 2002, the London Institute of 'Pataphysics organised an exhibition consisting of recreations of all the art works seen in the film. There is still dispute whether the drawings and paintings, attributed to Hancock and his roommate, were all produced by the same artist, Alistair Grant (1925–1997). or whether Hancock's poor quality 'Infantilist School' artworks were actually produced as a joke by the British modernist painter, John Bratby.

Release and reception
The Rebels British premiere was at the Plaza Cinema in London's West End on 2 March 1961, following a screening at the Beirut Film Festival. An anonymous reviewer (most likely Dudley Carew) in The Times, at the time of the film's British release, said Hancock had "made the transition from small to large screen" in this film "with gratifying success". According to the Motion Picture Herald, the film was the 6th most popular movie at the UK box office in 1961. Hancock was nominated for the BAFTA Award for Most Promising Newcomer to Leading Film Roles in 1962.

On its release in the US, under the title Call Me Genius (retitled as there was an existing TV series with the same name), the film was not well received. Bosley Crowther in The New York Times wrote: "Norman Wisdom can move over. The British have found a low comedian who is every bit as low as he is and even less comical". He thought it was derivative.

A reviewer writing for the British Film Institute's Screenonline website commented: "In this film, comic rebellion places artists as the antithesis of workers and there is a kind of lazy shorthand at work that conflates artists with Paris, existentialism, angry young men, beatniks and beat poets. Cod philosophical discussions of what art is about permeate the film, but this reflects the times accurately". Galton and Simpson wrote in January 2012 that the best review they ever received was from artist Lucian Freud who reportedly described it as the best film made about modern art.

Quotes
On Mrs. Crevatte seeing one of Hancock's pictures on the wall:
 Mrs. Crevatte: What's this 'orrible thing?
 Hancock: That, is a self-portrait.
 Mrs. Crevatte: ooh ov?
 Hancock: Laurel and Hardy!!

On Mrs. Crevatte first encountering Hancock's Aphrodite at the Waterhole
 Mrs. Crevatte: Here, have you been having models up here - have there been naked women in my establishment?
 Hancock: Of course there haven't. I can't afford thirty-bob an hour. I did that from memory. That is women as I see them.
 Mrs. Crevatte: Oh! ... You poor man!

The abstract expressionist painting scene:
 Hancock: It's worth 2000 quid of anybody's money that is!

A definition of Existentialism
 Josey: We only live in the present; there is no future. Why kill time when you can kill yourself?
 Upon seeing a young Clerk (a 'Reginald', he pejoratively conjectures), on the opposite railway carriage seat:  If this train’s still running in 1980, he'll still be on it.

As he takes his leave of the Paris Art World at his final exhibition:
 Hancock: Ladies and gentlemen, I shall now bid you all good day. I'm off! I know what I was cut out to do and I should have done it long ago. YOU'RE ALL RAVING MAD!! None of you know what you're looking at. You wait 'til I'm dead, you'll see I was right!

Bibliography
Brotchie, Alistair & Irvin, Magnus - Encomia for Anthony Hancock: the Rebel (London Institute of 'Pataphysics), 2002

DVD release
Using new high definition transfer the film was released on DVD in 2019 by Network Distributing Limited.

Novelization
Concurrent with the opening of the film, May Fair Books released a paperback novelization of the screenplay. By-lined "Alan Holmes" was a pseudonym for Piccadilly Western novelist Gordon Landsborough.

References

External links

1961 films
1961 comedy films
British comedy films
British satirical films
Films shot at Associated British Studios
Films about rebels
Films directed by Robert Day
Films based on television series
Films about fictional painters
Films about the visual arts
1960s satirical films
Films set in London
Films set in Paris
1960s English-language films
1960s British films